Numbi may refer to:

 Denis Kalume Numbi, Interior Minister of the Democratic Republic of the Congo
 John Numbi, Inspector General of the Democratic Republic of the Congo police
 Numbi numbi, a sinkhole in Northern Territory, Australia